HLA-B37 (B37) is an HLA-B serotype. The serotype identifies the more common HLA-B*37 gene products. (For terminology help see: HLA-serotype tutorial)

Serotype

Alleles

References

3